Sunniside is a small rural village to the east of Tow Law and north of Crook in County Durham, England.

Sunniside has two pubs, and a former post office. There is a collection of newly built homes in the west of the village, called The Paddock. There are five streets, Gladstone Terrace, Flag Terrace, Front Street (the main street) Garden Terrace, and a little offshoot along a back road to Roddymoor, called Grahams Cottages.

Geography  

Notable people 
 Morris Emmerson (born 1942), professional footballer

References

External links

Villages in County Durham
Crook, County Durham